The Château de Bonnefontaine is a château in the commune of Antrain, Ille-et-Vilaine, France. It dates to the second quarter of the 16th century. Noted for its elegant turrets and tall windows, it became a monument historique on 16 September 1943. The park was laid out by Denis Bühler and Édouard André.

References

External links

Official site

Châteaux in Ille-et-Vilaine
Monuments historiques of Ille-et-Vilaine